Mobile Softee (雪糕車) is an ice cream vendor in Hong Kong which uses ice cream trucks.. The brand is owned by Ng Enterprises Ltd.

History 
Ho King-yuen was inspired by the Mister Softee (Chinese: 富豪雪糕) trucks he saw while visiting London. When he returned from his trip, he made a plan with two of his friends to bring the brand to Hong Kong. The first truck was imported from England and began to operate in 1970 on the eve of Chinese New Year.

The ice cream was very cheap, with a soft serve cone selling for $.05 when the business first opened.

The red-white-blue vans also began to be seen in Shanghai in 1994, and numbered 18 as of August 2005.

Mister Softee's Hong Kong operation was renamed to Mobile Softee in 2010 after the rights to the Mister Softee name were retracted.

Organization 
The headquarters of the company is located in Fo Tan.

Vans 
Because the Hong Kong Government has stopped the issue of new hawking licenses since 1978, and the existing licenses cannot be transferred to other vehicles, the old trucks are still in use. The company has 14 vans running on Hong Kong Island, Kowloon and the New Territories. 

Each van is painted in blue, red, and white. As required by the law, each van has a soft serve machine, a basin, and two refrigerators. The vans play The Blue Danube.

The trucks sell only four products, which have remained the same since its inception:

 soft serve ice cream
 nutty drumstick
 large cups (Chinese: 蓮花杯 "lotus cups")
 Jumbo Orange (Chinese: 珍寶橙冰), a kind of orange sherbet).
Vanilla is usually the only flavor served, but strawberry soft serve is sometimes seen around Chinese New Year.

References

Mister Softee in Hong Kong - How to Gain Happiness for a Few Hong Kong Dollars

Catering and food service companies of Hong Kong
Hong Kong cuisine
Ice cream vans